WPRO (630 AM) is a commercial radio station in Providence, Rhode Island.  It is owned by Cumulus Media, broadcasting a talk radio format, simulcast on co-owned 99.7 WEAN-FM.  The studios for WPRO and other Cumulus Providence stations are on Wampanoag Road in East Providence, at the Salty Brine Broadcast Center, named after WPRO's longtime morning host.  

WPRO is powered at 5,000 watts, non-directional by day.  But to protect other stations on 630 AM from interference, at night it uses a directional antenna with a two-tower array.  The transmitter is co-located with the studios in East Providence.

Programming
Much of WPRO's weekday lineup is made up of local hosts.  At night, nationally syndicated programs are heard: The Ben Shapiro Show, CBS Eye on the World with John Batchelor and Red Eye Radio.  Weekends mostly focus on specialty shows about money, health, pets, home repair, real estate and the law, some of which are paid brokered programming.  The Ramsey Show with Dave Ramsey is heard on Sunday evenings.  Some hours begin with an update from ABC News Radio.

WPRO is an affiliate of the New England Patriots Radio Network.  It carried Boston Red Sox baseball from 1986 to 2005.  In 2006, Red Sox games moved to WEEI-FM (now WVEI-FM).

History

Early years
The earliest ancestor to WPRO, WKBF, began broadcasting from Cranston, Rhode Island, on June 15, 1924. It was owned by Dutee Wilcox Flint and operating at 1050 kilocycles. In January 1925, the call sign was changed to WDWF, reflecting the owner's initials, and the station moved to 680 kHz.  

That December, Lincoln Studios began to share ownership of the station with Flint. Lincoln broadcast its programming under the call sign WLSI.  WDWF and WLSI moved to 800 kHz by June 30, 1927.  It shifted to 1090 kHz in October, to 1150 kHz in November, and to 1210 kHz in February 1928.  By 1930, the studios for WDWF and WLSI were located in Providence.

The Cherry & Webb era (September 1931–April 1959)
Providence department store Cherry & Webb acquired WDWF and WLSI in September 1931, and merged the two stations under a single license with the call letters WPRO. The merged station formally relaunched on October 16.  The purchase made Cherry & Webb the third department store in Providence to get into radio broadcasting, after the 1922 launches of Shepard Stores' WEAN (now WPRV, a sister station to WPRO) and The Outlet Company's WJAR (now WHJJ).  The following February, Cherry & Webb purchased another station at 1210 kHz, WPAW in nearby Pawtucket, which had been granted a license in August 1926 as WFCI, owned by Frank Cook Inc. and operating at 1160 kHz, moved to 1330 kHz by June 30, 1927, to 1240 that August, and to 1210 kHz in November 1928, concurrent with the change to WPAW.  Following the acquisition, the station used WPAW in tandem with WPRO until 1933.  The station moved to its current frequency, 630 kHz, in 1934.  WPRO was an affiliate of the short-lived American Broadcasting System in 1935; in 1937, the station joined the CBS Radio Network, replacing charter affiliate WEAN.

Although WPRO's city of license was changed from Cranston to Providence soon after Cherry & Webb took over, the station's transmitter remained in Cranston until its destruction in the 1938 New England hurricane; it then constructed a new transmission facility in East Providence.  FM service was added on April 17, 1948, with the debut of WPRO-FM (92.3 MHz), and a television sister station, WPRO-TV (channel 12), went on the air March 27, 1955.

The CapCities era (April 1959–1993)
Cherry & Webb exited broadcasting in April 1959, selling the WPRO stations to Capital Cities Television Corporation, which eventually became Capital Cities Communications.  Soon afterward, WPRO ended its CBS Radio affiliation and became Providence's top-rated top 40 station, competing against WICE (now WPVD) and, later, WGNG (now WSJW).  The station's studios were moved to the transmitter location in East Providence in 1974; WPRO's previous studio location, which until then had also continued to house what had become WPRI-TV even after that station was sold by Capital Cities in 1967, was then donated to public television station WSBE-TV.  That same year, WPRO-FM adopted its own top 40 format, and the AM side began a gradual evolution to adult contemporary that would continue through the remainder of the decade.  During the 1980s, the station again began to shift its format by gradually adding talk shows to its schedule; it also became an affiliate of ABC Radio by 1984, two years before ABC was purchased by Capital Cities.  WPRO discontinued its remaining music programming on March 20, 1989, moving to an all-talk format.

Tele-Media takes over (1993–present)
Capital Cities/ABC sold WPRO to Tele-Media in 1993; this put the station under common ownership with WLKW (the former WEAN) and WWLI. Tele-Media, in turn, sold its stations to Citadel Broadcasting (which would eventually purchase the radio assets of former station owner ABC [by then part of Disney] in 2007) in 1997.  WPRO added its simulcast on WEAN-FM on March 11, 2008. Citadel merged with Cumulus Media on September 16, 2011.

Former on-air staff
WPRO's longest-serving on-air staff member was Salty Brine, who served as the station's morning host from 1943 until April 28, 1993.  Other former WPRO voices include sportscaster Bryan Fustukian (as Vik Armen). New York media personalities who previously worked at WPRO include WABC host Mark Simone, WMCA "Good Guy" Jack Spector, WCBS-TV correspondent Magee Hickey, CBS staff announcer Hal Simms, WCBS-FM personality Dave Stewart (as David Spencer on WPRO), and former Providence mayor Buddy Cianci until his death on January 27, 2016.

References

External links

PRO (AM)
News and talk radio stations in the United States
Radio stations established in 1924
1924 establishments in Rhode Island
Cumulus Media radio stations